My Kung-Fu Sweetheart is a 2006 Hong Kong film directed by Wong Jing.

Cast
 Cecilia Cheung
 Leo Ku
 Yuen Wah
 Yuen Qiu
 Wong Jing
 Sammy Leung
 Yat-fei Wong
 Chin Kar-lok
 Lam Suet
 Benz Hui
 Lam Chi Chung

External links

 HK cinemagic entry
 loveHKfilm entry

Hong Kong comedy films
2000s Cantonese-language films
2006 films
2006 comedy films
Films directed by Wong Jing
2000s Hong Kong films